(or simply Green Hill) is the first level of the platform game Sonic the Hedgehog, which released for the Sega Genesis in 1991. The level is grassy and lush, with environmental features such as palm trees, vertical loops and cliffs, and is the home of numerous forest animals. Like the game's other levels, Green Hill comprises 3 acts; in the third, Sonic fights antagonist Doctor Eggman before moving to the second level, Marble Zone. It was constructed by level designer Hirokazu Yasuhara with its musical theme by Masato Nakamura.

Green Hill Zone is considered to be a video game classic; the level and its music have also received positive opinions from critics. It has appeared in other games in the series, such as Sonic Adventure 2, Sonic Generations, Sonic Mania, and Sonic Forces. Critics have noted a Green Hill-like aesthetic in levels of other games.

History
Green Hill is the first level of Sonic the Hedgehog. Located on South Island, it is a lush, grassy stage with unique features like droopy palm trees and crumbling cliffs. In addition, as with later levels in the game, Green Hill has environmental features and obstacles like ramps, vertical loops, tunnels, spring-boards, spikes, and checkpoints. It is normally populated by woodland creatures, but antagonist Doctor Eggman imprisons them inside robots known as Badniks prior to the events of the game, so the player must destroy them to free the animals. Green Hill consists of three acts, and the end of Act 3 features a boss battle with Robotnik. After beating Robotnik, Sonic moves on to the second level, the lava-themed Marble Zone.

Sonic the Hedgehog was created by the newly formed Sonic Team, a 15-member Sega subsidiary formed to create a character that could compete with Nintendo's Mario. The game's level design was handled by Hirokazu Yasuhara, and the musical theme was composed by Masato Nakamura from the Japanese band Dreams Come True. In designing Green Hill, Yasuhara was inspired by the U.S. state of California, while the game's color scheme in general was influenced by the work of pop artist Eizin Suzuki. While the original game was a 2D side-scroller, Green Hill was remade in full 3D as a secret level in the 2001 game Sonic Adventure 2; the player unlocks it after collecting all 180 of the emblems found by completing the game's many objectives. The 2011 game Sonic Generations, a title that revisits past entries in the Sonic series, features both 2D ("Classic") and 3D ("Modern") versions of Green Hill, as well as of numerous other Sonic levels. A reinterpretation of the level appears in the 2017 title Sonic Mania. Green Hill reappears in Sonic Forces, having partially turned to desert due to resource depletion by Eggman's industries. Digital recreations of Green Hill appear in the 2022 game Sonic Frontiers as part of the game's Cyber Space levels.

In addition, Green Hill appears as a stage in the 2.5D fighting game Sonic Battle, in the tennis video game Sega Superstars Tennis, in the sports video game Mario & Sonic at the Sochi 2014 Olympic Winter Games, in the mobile title Sonic Dash, in the crossover adventure game Lego Dimensions, and in the crossover fighting games Dengeki Bunko: Fighting Climax and the Super Smash Bros. series. In the 2020 film Sonic the Hedgehog, Green Hill is depicted as Sonic's original home. The film also features Sonic living a small town in Montana named Green Hills.

During the 30th anniversary of Sonic, Nakamura and Dreams Come True released "Tsugi no Se~no! De - On The Green Hill - DCT version", a single of the Green Hill Zone theme which introduced lyrics to the theme for the first time was released on July 7, 2021. A music video followed just a few months after the single's release in September of that year. An alternate version of the track with more Genesis/Megadrive sounding instruments was released sometime after the single and was titled the "Masado & Miwasco version".

A Lego Ideas set based on the level was released on January 1, 2022.

Reception
Green Hill Zone has received consistently positive opinions from critics, particularly for its music. Craig Snyder at MakeUseOf named the level as one of the five best levels in video games, calling it "a great way to prepare for what’s to come".  Game Informers Tim Turi found the level's music "catchy", and Wong ranked it as the thirteenth greatest piece of gaming music from the 16-bit era. In 2010, Sega's community manager, Aaron Webber, returned from a vacation to find his cubicle redecorated to resemble Green Hill; IGN's Levi Buchanan claimed that "everyone wants to come back to" this, and Owen Good of Kotaku exclaimed "I want to work in Green Hill Zone, too!" Writing for the Sabotage Times, Carl Anka ranked the original Sonic the Hedgehog as having the greatest music of any video game, largely as a result of Green Hill's theme.

Critics have compared levels of later Sonic games to Green Hill, as well as to World 1-1 of Super Mario Bros. Turi considers Emerald Hill from Sonic the Hedgehog 2, Mushroom Hill from Sonic & Knuckles, and Seaside Hill from Sonic Heroes to fit the same general mold as Green Hill, noting repetition in Sonic level design and stating that "gamers have played Green Hill Zone dozens of times." However, he has opined that the Sonic Generations version of the original Green Hill "trounces them all" in both its 2D and 3D incarnations. Justin Baker of Nintendo World Report and Skrebels both analogized Windy Hill from Sonic Lost World to Green Hill, while Carter thought similarly of The Legend of Zelda downloadable content levels. The decision to include Green Hill in other games in the series, such as Sonic Forces, has been a source of debate among some fans, who believe that Sega has overused the stage since its debut.

Green Hill Zone has also been recognized by critics as a classic, well-known video game level. It has been described as "classic" by Samit Sarkar of Polygon and by Jim Sterling and Chris Carter of Destructoid. Comparably, Joe Skrebels of Official Nintendo Magazine called it "nostalgic", while Christopher Grant from Joystiq considered it to have a place "in the center of your retro-gaming shrine". Kevin Wong of Complex stated that the game's and level's popularity were such that "even if you didn't have a Genesis, this was the level you played at the department store while your parents went shopping." Andy Kelly from Computer and Video Games called the Green Hill theme a "monumental slice of Sega nostalgia", and GamesRadar writer Justin Towell also referred to it as classic. Anka has summarized that "Green Hill Zone in the original game has gone down as an instantly recognisable piece of music in pop culture".

To mark Sonic's fifteenth anniversary in 2006, Sega released a papercraft version of Green Hill as a PDF on its website. In 2011, not long after the release of Sonic Generations, Sega held a contest inviting gamers to upload YouTube video playthroughs of the game's 3D version of Green Hill completed in less than one minute and fifty seconds; winners were eligible for Sonic merchandise.

Notes

See also 

 World 1-1
 Level design

References

External links

1991 in video gaming
Fictional elements introduced in 1991
Sega Genesis
Sonic the Hedgehog
Video game levels
Video game locations